Three Rooker Island, (also known as Three Rooker Bar) is an island in Pinellas County, Florida. The island is west of Tarpon Springs, south of Anclote Key and north of Honeymoon Island. It is accessible only by boat and its shape and size often change from interaction with ocean currents.

Compared to neighboring barrier islands, Three Rooker Island is newly formed and emerged in the 1980s as water currents built up the sand bar above sea level. By the 1990s it was large enough for vegetation to establish itself on the newly formed island further stabilizing it and making it more resistant to washing away. Three Rooker Island is part of the Anclote Key Preserve State Park and is partially protected for nesting seabirds while also allowing it to be a popular place for local boaters.

References

Gulf Coast barrier islands of Florida
Islands of Pinellas County, Florida
Islands of Florida